Sir Jonathan Leslie Baker (born 6 August 1955), styled The Rt Hon Lord Justice Baker, is a Judge of the Court of Appeal of England and Wales.

He was educated at St Albans School and St John's College, Cambridge.

He was called to the bar at Middle Temple in 1978. He was a recorder from 2000 to 2009, and judge of the High Court of Justice (Family Division) from 2009 - 2018.

In October 2017, he was appointed as the Senior Family Liaison Judge.

In October 2018, he was appointed as a Judge of the Court of Appeal.

References

1955 births
Living people
People educated at St Albans School, Hertfordshire
Alumni of St John's College, Cambridge
Members of the Middle Temple
Family Division judges
Knights Bachelor
Lords Justices of Appeal
Members of the Privy Council of the United Kingdom